George John Gordon Bruce, 7th Lord Balfour of Burleigh (18 October 1883 – 4 June 1967) was a Scottish peer and banker. He was a representative peer for Scotland in the British House of Lords from 1923 to 1963, and was Chairman of Lloyds Bank from 1946 to 1954.

References

Lords of Parliament

George
Scottish representative peers
1883 births
1967 deaths
Scottish bankers
20th-century Scottish businesspeople
Lords Balfour of Burleigh